Nilesh Rambhai Odedra (born 15 April 1973) is a former Indian cricketer. He played as a left-handed batsman and right-arm offbreak bowler.

Between 1989 and 1996, he played for Saurashtra cricket team in 26 first-class cricket and 15 List A cricket matches. Primarily a batsman, he scored 1,684 first-class runs at a batting average of 37.42 runs per innings, making four centuries and a highest score of 142. He was born in Porbandar, Gujarat.

References 

Indian cricketers
Saurashtra cricketers
1973 births
Living people
Cricketers from Gujarat
Gujarat cricketers